Transport in Angola comprises:

Roads

Railways 

There are three separate railway lines in Angola:
 Luanda Railway (CFL) (northern)
 Benguela Railway (CFB) (central)
 Moçâmedes Railway (CFM) (southern)

Reconstruction of these three lines began in 2005 and they are now all operational. The Benguela Railway connects to the Democratic Republic of the Congo.

Waterways 
 1,300 km navigable (2008)
country comparison to the world: 36

Pipelines 
 gas, 2 km; crude oil 87 km (2008)

In April 2012, the Zambian Development Agency (ZDA) and an Angolan company signed a memorandum of understanding (MoU) to build a multi-product pipeline from Lobito to Lusaka, Zambia, to deliver various refined products to Zambia.

Angola plans to build an oil refinery in Lobito in the coming years.

Ports and harbors 

The government plans to build a deep-water port at Barra do Dande, north of Luanda, in Bengo province near Caxito.

Merchant marine 
 total: 6
country comparison to the world: 128
 by type: cargo 1, passenger/cargo 2, petroleum tanker 2, roll on/roll off 1
 foreign owned: 1 (Spain)
 registered in other countries: 6 (Bahamas) (2008)

Airports 
 211 (2008)

Airports – with paved runways 
 total: 30
 over 3,047 m: 5
 2,438 to 3,047 m: 8
 1,524 to 2,437 m: 12
 914 to 1,523 m: 4
 under 914 m: 1 (2008)

Airports – with unpaved runways 
 total:  181 (2008)
 over 3,047 m: 2
 2,438 to 3,047 m: 5
 1,524 to 2,437 m: 32
 914 to 1,523 m: 100
 under 914 m: 42 (2008)

Angolan Airlines 
 TAAG Angola Airlines
 Sonair
 Fly Angola

International and domestic services are maintained by TAAG Angola Airlines, Aeroflot, British Airways, Brussels Airlines, Lufthansa, Air France, Cubana, Ethiopian Airlines, Emirates, Delta Air Lines, Royal Air Maroc, Iberia, Hainan Airlines, Kenya Airways, South African Airways, TAP Air Portugal and several regional carriers.  There are airstrips at Benguela, Cabinda, Huambo, Moçâmedes, and Catumbela.

References 
This article comes from the CIA World Factbook 2003.